The City of Lower North Shore is a proposed local government area which would be formed from the merger of the suburbs of Willoughby, Lane Cove, North Sydney, Mosman, and the southern parts of Kuringgai, in New South Wales, Australia.

Suburbs
Artarmon
Cammeray
Castle Cove
Castlecrag
Chatswood
Chatswood West
Cremorne
Cremorne Point
Crows Nest
East Killara
East Lindfield
East Willoughby
Greenwich
Hunters Hill
Killara
Kirribilli
Lane Cove
Lane Cove North
Lane Cove West
Lavender Bay
Lindfield
Linley Point
Longueville
McMahons Point
Middle Cove
Milsons Point
Mosman
Naremburn
Neutral Bay
North Sydney
North Willoughby
Northbridge
Northwood
Riverview
Roseville
Roseville Chase
St Leonards
Waverton
Willoughby
Wollstonecraft

Local government areas of New South Wales